The HKS 700E is a twin-cylinder, horizontally opposed, four stroke, carburetted aircraft engine, designed for use on ultralight aircraft, powered parachutes and ultralight trikes. The engine is manufactured by HKS, a Japanese company noted for its automotive racing engines.

Development
The HKS 700E has dual capacitor discharge ignition, dual carburetors and electric start.  The engine is mainly air-cooled, but with oil-cooled cylinder heads. The OHV pushrod engine has four valves per cylinder, and nickel-ceramic coated cylinder bores. Lubrication is dry sump, with a trochoid pump.

The reduction drive is a choice of two integral gearboxes: the A-type gearbox has a 2.58:1 ratio and can accommodate propellers of up to 4,000 kg/cm2 inertial load; the B-type gearbox has a 3.47:1 ratio and can accommodate propellers of up to 6,000 kg/cm2.

The recommended time between overhauls is 1000 hours, although this is expected to be increased as experience is gained.

HKS 700E engines from serial number 101105 and above meet ASTM standard 2339-05, which governs the design and manufacture of reciprocating engines for light-sport aircraft. Compliance with the ASTM standard means the aircraft is applicable for use on special or experimental light-sport aircraft (S-LSA or E-LSA).

The company's owner's manual disclaimer states:

Variants
700E
700T
The engine's dry weight is  equipped with electrical system, electric starter, fuel injectors, gearbox, exhaust system and turbocharger. The initial time between overhauls is recommended as 500 hours, but this is expected to rise with operational experience.

Applications

Specifications (700E)

See also

References

External links

Distributor's website

2000s aircraft piston engines